Harmony Grove High School may refer to:

 Harmony Grove High School (Benton, Arkansas) in Benton, Arkansas
 Harmony Grove High School (Camden, Arkansas) in Camden, Arkansas

See also
 Grove High School (disambiguation)